Taula is an island in Tonga. It is located in the far south of the Vavaʻu Group in the far north of the country.

References

Islands of Tonga
Vavaʻu